The SIG MCX is a family of firearms designed and manufactured by SIG Sauer, produced in both selective fire and semi-automatic only models, and features a short-stroke gas piston system, which is inherited from the earlier SIG MPX submachine gun. The MCX is available in rifle, carbine, short-barreled rifle, and pistol configurations (the latter configuration generally conforming to the definition of a compact carbine but for taking a pistol brace rather than a buttstock). The rifle was further developed into the SIG MCX Spear, which was adopted in its .277 Fury chambering as the XM7 by the U.S. Army in 2022.

History 
The SIG MCX was first introduced at SHOT Show 2015. The rifle was originally designed by SIG USA, the subsidiary of SIG Sauer based in New Hampshire.  In 2016, SIG recalled some of the rifles that had the first-generation bolt carrier group.  A SIG MCX was used in the 2016 Orlando nightclub shooting, which at the time was the deadliest mass shooting in U.S. history, now second to the 2017 Las Vegas shooting.

Design
The SIG MCX series features a short-stroke gas piston system to reduce recoil and improve the reliability of the weapon; this was based on the design of the earlier SIG MPX. The MCX features a system that allows for conversion between 5.56×45mm NATO, .300 AAC Blackout, and 7.62×39mm ammunition, using standard 5.56 mm STANAG magazines for 5.56×45mm NATO and .300 AAC Blackout, and specially designed STANAG-compatible magazines for 7.62×39mm. The MCX is designed to deliver optimal performance with .300 AAC Blackout and an optional suppressor.

The barrel's profile is tapered at the crown to allow the installation of muzzle devices and direct-thread sound suppressors without the use of washers that degrade performance and allows the devices to self-center on installation. The barrel can be changed in a matter of seconds to another length or a different caliber. Additionally the barrels are nitride coated for corrosion resistance. It features hardened steel wear points.

First generation MCX variants have a forend made of aluminum with a KeyMod system to add accessories while second generation MCX variants have an M-LOK handguard. Controls are mostly ambidextrous including the charging handle but not the bolt release. Sig produces four stock configurations are available for the MCX carbine. The overall layout of the two rifles is similar. SIG designed the upper receiver to be compatible with standard AR-15 and M16 lower receivers with the help of an adapter.

An integrally suppressed upper receiver group based on the MCX was selected by USSOCOM for the SURG (Suppressed Upper Receiver Group) contract in July 2018. These suppressed uppers would be paired with existing M4A1 lowers in SOCOM inventory.

Variants

SIG MCX 
The SIG MCX is available with a safe/semi-automatic trigger group for the U.S. civilian market, or safe/semi-automatic/fully automatic trigger group for the military and law enforcement agencies.

SIG Sauer offers the rifle in semi-automatic only in three different configurations for the civilian market:

 The SIG MCX PATROL is the standard configuration of the rifle with a 406 mm (16 in) barrel.
 The SIG MCX SBR is a short-barreled rifle configuration of the rifle with a 229 mm (9 in) barrel. (Under U.S. federal law, rifles with barrels shorter than 16 inches are Title II weapons, which are subject to federal restrictions, as well as being regulated by state laws).
 The SIG MCX Pistol is the pistol configuration of the rifle with a 229 mm (9 in) barrel or 292 mm (11.5 in) barrel and comes either with the SIG Sauer SBX (pistol stabilizing brace) or SIG Sauer PCB (pistol pivoting contour folding brace). (This configuration fits the U.S. legal definition of a "handgun", in that it is only designed to be fired with a single point of contact with the shooter's body, though it is really a compact carbine rifle, as it fires an intermediate round. The BATFE previously warned users that shouldering a weapon fitted with the SIG SBX, or a similar forearm brace, and not registered as a short-barreled rifle, constitutes the making of a short-barreled rifle, which is a Title II weapon. However, as of April 2017, this is no longer the case).
 The SIG MCX Low Visibility Assault Weapon (LVAW) is a short-barreled, suppressed, select-fire variant available only to military and law enforcement agencies. It is nicknamed the "Black Mamba".

SIG MCX VIRTUS 
The SIG MCX VIRTUS is the second generation of the SIG MCX series and was introduced in 2017.

 The SIG MCX VIRTUS Patrol is the standard configuration rifle that features a 406 mm (16 in) barrel, a 1:7 inch twist, a custom Sig Matchlite Duo Trigger for improved accuracy, a folding and collapsing 5-position stock, four handguard lengths to choose from, interchangeable barrels and a special internal recoil system.
 The SIG MCX VIRTUS SBR is the short-barreled rifle configuration of the MCX VIRTUS. It features a 292 mm (11.5 in) barrel for the 5.56×45mm NATO caliber, and a 140 mm (5.5 in) barrel and 229 mm (9 in) barrel for the .300 AAC Blackout caliber.
 The SIG MCX VIRTUS Pistol is the pistol configuration of the MCX VIRTUS which features an SBX stabilizer brace. It features an 292 mm (11.5 in) barrel for the 5.56×45mm NATO caliber, and a 229 mm (9 in) barrel for the .300 AAC Blackout caliber.

SIG MCX RATTLER 
The SIG MCX RATTLER is a short-barreled rifle variant chambered in  .300 AAC Blackout and 5.56. It is intended to serve as a personal defense weapon, featuring a  barrel, and comes with a Picatinny rail tail interface for attaching either a compact buttstock or a folding PCB (pistol contour brace). In February 2018, USSOCOM ordered upper receiver group conversion kits for the MCX Rattler in .300BLK for evaluation. The MCX Rattler was later selected as the winner of SOCOM's Commercial Personal Defense Weapon (CPDW) contract in May 2022 and suppressed MCX Rattlers will be ordered in 5.56 and .300BLK.

SIG MCX-SPEAR LT
The SIG MCX-SPEAR LT is the third generation of the SIG MCX, introduced in 2022. It is available in 5.56 mm NATO, .300 Blackout and 7.62x39mm.

Derivatives

SIG MCX-SPEAR  
The SIG MCX SPEAR was developed as Sig Sauer's submission for the United States Army Next Generation Squad Weapon (NGSW) program and is chambered in 6.8×51mm SIG Fury cartridge. Sig Sauer was chosen as the winner on 19 April 2022, designating the weapon the XM5 (later XM7) in U.S. military service.

Users

: Used by the NSW Police Force Tactical Operations Unit and Victoria Police Special Operations Group in .300BLK. SIG MCX in .300BLK is being acquired for Army special forces units from 2024 to replace the H&K MP5.
 : DSU and the special response unit of the Ghent local police (COPS)
: Saskatchewan Conservation Officers.
 : Used by the K-Commando
  : Groupement de commandos de montagne, 27th Mountain Infantry Brigade, 5 in 2021, all rifles acquired in .300 AAC Blackout.
 : Berlin Police, 300 modified MCXs to meet the police's requirements were ordered in October 2017, plus an additional 160 units for the SEK of Berlin, Landespolizei of Schleswig Holstein, 531 units ordered. Rhineland-Palatinate Police: more than 100 rifles ordered in late 2019.
 : Used by Shayetet 13, the Israel Defense Forces Naval Commando unit.
 : Used by Kopassus, Indonesian Special forces commando in limited service and so does Mobile Brigade Corps
 : Used by the Netherlands Maritime Special Operations Forces and the Dienst Speciale Interventies. All rifles acquired in .300 AAC Blackout and fitted with the SIG Suppressed Upper Receiver.
 : Jednostka Wojskowa Grom and JW Formoza acquired the SIG MCX VIRTUS and MCX RATTLER in .300 AAC Blackout with conversion kits to 5.56×45mm NATO and 7.62×39mm ammunition.
 : Polícia de Segurança Pública acquired SIG MCX in 5.56×45mm NATO used by Special Operations Group (Portugal).
 : Used by the SBU Alpha Group.
 : Used by the Police Counter Terrorist Specialist Firearms Officers including the Metropolitan Police Service and UKSF to replace the HK MP5SD3s.
 : XM7 being acquired for all DoD branches. SIG MCX Rattler in .300BLK is being acquired for USSOCOM forces. The LVAW (Low Visibility Assault Weapon), an MCX variant, is used by multiple SOCOM forces including United States Navy SEALs, Delta Force, and Joint Special Operations Command.

See also
AR-15 style rifle
LR-300, another folding stock AR-15 style rifle
AR-18, another Short-stroke piston, rotating bolt folding stock AR-15 style rifle

References

External links

SIG MCX on SIG Sauer's official website
sigsauer.com 
Guide To The SIG Sauer MCX - The Firearm Blog

.300 BLK firearms
5.56 mm assault rifles
7.62×39mm semi-automatic rifles
Semi-automatic rifles
Short stroke piston firearms
Weapons and ammunition introduced in 2015
ArmaLite AR-10 derivatives
AR-15 style rifles
Designated marksman rifles
Carbines
Personal defense weapons
SIG Sauer rifles